The Moor Express or Moorexpress is a heritage railway in the northern part of Lower Saxony in Germany. It runs between Stade and Osterholz-Scharmbeck passing through Bremervörde, Gnarrenburg and Worpswede.

Services 
 Tickets for the special rail services, which run between May and October, can be purchased directly from the guard in the train or at tourist bureaux and travel agents in the region.
 Bicycles may be carried.
 Since 2006 the Moor Express has run to Bremen Hauptbahnhof ("Bremen Central Station").
 The Moor Express is not part of the Verkehrsverbund Bremen-Niedersachsen (VBN) nor the Hamburger Verkehrsverbund (HVV).
 Infotrail have provided an audio guide. Passengers are able to hear information, interviews and the history of the line and the local region on MP3 players.

Literature 
 Lutz Schadeck: Der Moorexpress - Unterwegs zwischen Stade und Bremen. Verlag Atelier im Bauernhaus, Fischerhude 2009, 
 Peter Elze, Karl-Robert Schütze: Der Moorexpress. Worpsweder Verlag, 2. Auflage 1984
 Dieter-Theodor Bohlmann: Die Eisenbahnen und Verkehrsbetriebe Elbe-Weser. Zeunert, Gifhorn 1984,   
 Gerd Wolff: Deutsche Klein- und Privatbahnen Band 10: Niedersachsen 2. EK-Verlag, Freiburg 2007,

External links 
  Moor Express timetable
  The operator: Eisenbahnen und Verkehrsbetriebe Elbe-Weser
  The society: Bremervörde-Osterholzer Eisenbahnfreunde e. V.
  The Elbe-Weser railways
  Eisenbahnen im Elbe-Weser-Dreieck
  The Moor Express
 Information on the Moor Express audio guide

Heritage railways in Germany
Railway lines in Bremen
Railway lines in Lower Saxony